Rastorguyev or Rastorguev is a Russian masculine surname, its feminine counterpart is Rastorguyeva or Rastorgueva. It may refer to
Nikolay Rastorguyev (born 1957), Russian singer 
Simon Rastorguev (born 1981), Russian architect
Stepan Rastorguyev (1864–after 1904), Russian  explorer

Russian-language surnames